Tom Bruggere (born February 18, 1946 in Berkeley, California) is an American entrepreneur and onetime candidate for the U.S. Senate in the state of Oregon. He founded the company Mentor Graphics and has been involved with several other startup companies.

Early life 
Tom Bruggere was born in Berkeley, California. He stated of his early life that he "grew up with a picture of Jack and Bobby Kennedy over [his] bed."

He has a Bachelor of Arts in Mathematics from the University of California, Santa Barbara, a Masters of Science in Computer Science from the University of Wisconsin, and a Masters of Business Administration from Pepperdine University. He served in the Army in the Vietnam War, from 1968-1970. Prior to running for office, he served on several government boards, including the Oregon State Board of Higher Education.

Bruggere was an engineer with Burroughs Corporation Medium Systems Plant in Pasadena, California in the early to mid-1970s, then with Tektronix, Inc. in the late 1970s.

He is Protestant.

Leadership of Mentor Graphics 
Bruggere founded Mentor Graphics, a Tektronix spinoff, in 1981. A 1991 article in Oregon Business magazine stated: "One of [Tektronix'] main contributions to Oregon has been the many companies that spun off from former employees," citing the success of Bruggere and a number of other creative former Tektronix employees with Mentor Graphics as the prime example. He was one of the people credited with founding the Oregon Center for Advanced Technology Education and served as chairman of the center in the early 2000s. Mentor Graphics is credited with having established the industry of electronic design automation. He resigned as president and CEO in October 1993, and was succeeded in both roles by Wally Rhines. Upon leaving Mentor Graphics, he cited a desire "to do something else, something in public policy."

1996 U.S. Senate race 

Bruggere won the Democratic nomination for the United States Senate seat vacated by the retiring Mark Hatfield in 1996. Spending $800,000 of his own money in the primary race, he was one of 134 candidates for the U.S. Congress to finance their own elections in excess of $50,000 in that cycle.

Bruggere's Republican opponent, Gordon Smith, was also heavily self-financed, having spent $2.5 million of his own money earlier that same year in an unsuccessful effort to defeat Democrat Ron Wyden in the special election to replace Bob Packwood, who had resigned.

In the general election race, most Oregon daily newspapers endorsed Smith over Bruggere. Bruggere lost a close election to Smith, with neither side claiming victory for several days after the election, when absentee ballots were tallied.

Further business ventures 
Bruggere was the founding Chairman of Stamps.com and Sensoria.  He resigned from the Stamps.com board in October 2000.

He has also served on the boards of Will Vinton Studios, OpenMarket, and Sirigen and on the advisory boards of Mercy Corps and of the Technology Management Program at UCSB.

As of 2011, he was part of the management team of 13therapeutics, a biotech spin-off of the Oregon Health & Science University (OHSU).

References

1946 births
Living people
Businesspeople from Oregon
People from Wilsonville, Oregon
Candidates in the 1996 United States elections
Oregon Democrats
20th-century American politicians
United States Army soldiers
Businesspeople from Berkeley, California
University of California, Santa Barbara alumni
University of Wisconsin–Madison alumni
Pepperdine University alumni
Tektronix people
Burroughs Corporation people
Engineers from Oregon
Engineers from California